Robert Edward Gross (July 2, 1905 – October 11, 1988) was an American surgeon and a medical researcher. He performed early work in pediatric heart surgery at Boston Children's Hospital. Gross was president of the American Association for Thoracic Surgery, a member of the National Academy of Sciences and a fellow of the American Academy of Arts and Sciences.

Biography
The National Academies Press called him "one of America's great pioneers of surgery".

The New York Times said that he did "pioneering work in the field of cardiac surgery".
According to his obituary in The New York Times, in 1938 Gross "performed the first surgical correction of one of the most common congenital heart disorders in children", referring to the ligation of the patent ductus.
Ten years later he performed the first surgery to graft artery tissue from one person into another, thus making a leap in methods of repairing of damaged arteries.
He also developed a method of cutting into a heart with a use of a plastic well that allowed to avoid a catastrophic loss of blood.
Gross was a member of the National Academy of Sciences. He was also Surgeon-in-chief, cardiovascular surgery, Children's Hospital, Boston.
Gross was a founder of the American Board of Surgery and the American Board of Thoracic Surgery. He also was a fellow of the American Academy of Arts and Sciences, a board member of the American Academy of Pediatrics and a member of the American Association for the Advancement of Science and the Society of University Surgeons.
In 1941 he coauthored "Abdominal Surgery of Infancy and Childhood" with Dr.William E Ladd. The book is considered a classic in surgical literature.
Gross was elected to the American Pediatric Hall of Fame.
The National Academies Press said that he "made many contributions that have altered the practice and understanding of surgery, pediatrics, and cardiology throughout the world".

Awards and distinctions
1951 - honorary D.Sc., Carleton College
1959 - M.D., Honoris Causa, Louvain University
1961 - M.D., Honoris Causa, Turin University
1962 - honorary D.Sc., Suffolk University
1963 - honorary D.Sc., University of Sheffield
1984 - honorary D.Sc., Harvard University
1953 - Honorary member, Reno Surgical Society
1955 - Honorary member, Dallas Southern Clinical Society
1956 - Honorary member, Buffalo Surgical Society
1958 - Honorary appointment, American National Red Cross, North Shore chapter
1961 - Honorary fellow, Spokane Surgical Society
1967 - Honorary citation, Barnstable County chapter, Massachusetts Heart Association
1959 - Officer of the Order of Leopold, Belgium
1959 - Honorary officer of the International Red Cross, Belgium
1960 - Honorary member, Pediatric Society of Guatemala
1964 - Honorary member, La Bocedad de Cirurgia Pediatrica de Mexico
1968 - Honorary member, Surgical Infantil Argentina Society
1973 - Honorary fellow, Royal College of Surgeons of England
1954-55 - Director, American Heart Association
1958-60 - Director, American Heart Association
1960 President, Massachusetts Heart Association
1963-64 President, American Association for Thoracic Surgery
1969-70 Board of directors, Massachusetts Heart Association
1970-71 First president, American Pediatric Surgical Association
1940 - E. Mead Johnson Award, American Academy of Pediatrics
1940 - Rudolf Matas Vascular Surgery Award, Tulane University
1954 - Children's Service Award, Toy Manufacturers of America
1954 - Albert Lasker Award, American Public Health Association
1956 - Roswell Park Gold Medal, Buffalo Surgical Society
1957 - Gold Medal, Louisville Surgical Society
1959 - Laeken Award, Brussels, Belgium
1959 - Gold Medal, Detroit Surgical Association
1959 - Albert Lasker Award, American Public Health Association
1959 - Billroth Medal, New York Academy of Medicine
1961 - Gold Medal Award, Golden Slipper Square Club of Philadelphia
1962 - Award of the Brotherhood Temple Ohabei Shalom, Brookline
1965 - William E. Ladd Medal Award, Surgical Section, American Academy of Pediatrics
1965 - Gold Cross, Royal Order of the Phoenix of the Greek Government
1968 - Denis Browne Gold Medal, British Association of Pediatric Surgeons
1969 - Dr. Rodman E. Sheen and Thomas G. Sheen Award, American Medical Association
1970 - Alfred Jurzykowski Medalist, New York Academy of Medicine citation with Dr. Farber and Dr. Neuhauser and the Children's Hospital Medical Center
1970 - Henry Jacob Bigelow Memorial Medal
1971 - Tina Award
1973 - Distinguished Service Medal, American Surgical Association

Education and career
1927 - B.A., Carleton College
1931 - M.D., Harvard University, Medical School
1934-36, Instructor in pathology, Harvard Medical School
1937-39, Instructor in surgery, Harvard Medical School
1939-40, Junior associate in surgery, Peter Bent Brigham Hospital
1939-42, Associate in surgery, Harvard Medical School
1939-46, Associate visiting surgeon, Children's Hospital, Boston
1940-46, Senior associate in surgery, Peter Bent Brigham Hospital
1942-47, Assistant professor of surgery, Harvard Medical School
1947-88, Ladd Professor of Children's Surgery, Harvard Medical School
1947-67, Surgeon-in-chief, Children's Hospital, Boston
1952, Surgeon-in-chief, pro-tempore, Ohio State University
1967-72, Surgeon-in-chief, cardiovascular surgery, Children's Hospital, Boston

References

External links

 Francis D. Moore and Judah Folkman, "Robert Edward Gross", Biographical Memoirs of the National Academy of Sciences (1995)

1905 births
1988 deaths
American thoracic surgeons
Members of the United States National Academy of Sciences
American pediatric surgeons
Fellows of the American Academy of Arts and Sciences
Harvard Medical School alumni
Harvard Medical School faculty
Recipients of the Lasker-DeBakey Clinical Medical Research Award
Carleton College alumni
20th-century surgeons